Jan Schiffer (born 5 May 1998) is a German field hockey player.

Career

Club level
In club competition, Schiffer plays for Uhlenhorst Mülheim in the German Bundesliga.

Junior national team
Jan Schiffer made his debut for the German U–21 team in 2016. His first appearance was during a test series in Mannheim. Later that year he went on to represent the team at the FIH Junior World Cup in Lucknow, winning a bronze medal.

In 2017, he won a second bronze medal with the junior team at the EuroHockey Junior Championship in Valencia.

His final year with the team was 2019. He made multiple appearances throughout the year, competing in numerous test matched and at an eight-nations tournament in Madrid. He finished his junior career on a high, winning gold at the EuroHockey Junior Championship in Valencia.

National team
Schiffer made his debut for the German national team in 2020, during a test series against South Africa in Johannesburg.

References

External links
 
 

1998 births
Living people
German male field hockey players
Male field hockey midfielders
Men's Feldhockey Bundesliga players
21st-century German people